Robat-e Arjomand (also Romanized as Robāţ-e Arjomand; also known as Robāţ-e Kaf Sān) is a village in Galehzan Rural District, in the Central District of Khomeyn County, Markazi Province, Iran. At the 2006 census, its population was 144, in 43 families.

References 

Populated places in Khomeyn County